Varney's Falls Dam is a historic lock and dam structure located on the James River near Gilmore Mills, Botetourt County, Virginia. It was built in 1851, and is a massive limestone structure. The lock chamber measures 100 feet long between gate recesses, 15 feet wide, and approximately 21 feet from the top on the upriver end to ground level.  Associated with the lock are the lock and dam abutment structures, the remaining towpaths, canal bed, berm bank, towpath culvert and remnants of a towpath bridge.  The dam was destroyed in 1881, and the lock gates removed in 1885.

It was listed on the National Register of Historic Places in 1993.  It is part of the James River and Kanawha Canal Historic District.

References

Dams on the National Register of Historic Places in Virginia
Buildings and structures in Botetourt County, Virginia
National Register of Historic Places in Botetourt County, Virginia
Dams completed in 1851
Historic district contributing properties in Virginia
1851 establishments in Virginia